The Bhai Pheru bus bombing was a bombing targeting a bus in Bhai Pheru (now Phool Nagar), Pakistan killing 52 and injuring 26.

Bombing
On 28 April 1996, a bus picked up passengers at Kot Radha Kishan bus stop in Bhai Pheru. The bus (FDJ 9176) was overcrowded with over 100 passengers on their way to celebrate Eid al-Adha in a 52-seater bus. In the bus, a bomb was placed underneath a seat near the fuel tank of the bus. At 10:30 am local time while the bus was going through the main marketplace in Bhai Pheru the bomb detonated. The detonation of the bomb ruptured the fuel tank of the bus causing a fireball that quickly spread throughout the bus. The bus continued burning for two hours until firefighters from other towns arrived. The bombing killed 52 people and injured 26.

References

1996 fires in Asia
1996 road incidents

1996 murders in Pakistan

20th century in Punjab, Pakistan
20th-century mass murder in Pakistan
Bus bombings in Asia
Bus incidents in Pakistan
Fires in Pakistan
Improvised explosive device bombings in 1996
Improvised explosive device bombings in Punjab, Pakistan
Kasur District
Marketplace attacks in Asia
Mass murder in 1996
Mass murder in Punjab, Pakistan
Terrorist incidents in Pakistan in 1996